Saadat Ali (born 6 February 1955) is a former Pakistani cricketer who played eight One Day Internationals for Pakistan in 1984. He has the distinction of being the first Pakistani to carry his bat in a one-day international when he was 78 not out.

Career 
Ali made his first-class debut in the 1973–74 season and his List A debut in 1974–75. Ali made his national team debut on 9 March 1984 at Gaddafi Stadium in Lahore against England. He played a further seven matches for his country, with the last of them held on 7 December 1984 at Multan Cricket Stadium against New Zealand. He continued to played first-class cricket until the 1988–89 season. He retired from List A cricket till 1989–90.

He held the national record for the most first-class runs in a season for House Building Finance Corporation and Lahore City Whites in 1983–84.

Ali became a match referee after his retirement. He has overseen 110 first-class, 63 List A, and 28 T20 matches, with the last of them held on 27 January 2015.

Personal life 
Saadat was born in Lahore, Punjab on 6 February 1955. His brother, Ashraf Ali, is also a former Pakistani cricketer who played in 8 Tests and 16 ODIs from 1980 to 1987.

References

External links 

1955 births
Living people
Pakistan One Day International cricketers
Pakistani cricketers
Lahore Greens cricketers
Lahore A cricketers
Punjab A cricketers
Income Tax Department cricketers
Pakistan Railways cricketers
Lahore City cricketers
Lahore City Whites cricketers
House Building Finance Corporation cricketers
United Bank Limited cricketers
Lahore City Blues cricketers
Punjab (Pakistan) cricketers
Cricketers from Lahore